The Florida Gators men's tennis team represents the University of Florida in the sport of tennis. The Gators compete in Division I of the National Collegiate Athletics Association (NCAA) and the Southeastern Conference (SEC). The team hosts its home matches in Linder Stadium on the university's Gainesville, Florida campus. Bryan Shelton has served as the men's tennis coach since 2013.

Florida's men tennis program has consistently been one of the most successful in college tennis for the past several decades. Since the university's men's tennis program was established in 1932, Florida has won three NCAA singles championships, one NCAA doubles championship, eighteen SEC regular season and tournament titles, and one national team championship.

Team history 
The Florida Gators men's tennis team was established in 1932 under head coach Dennis K. "Dutch" Stanley. In eight years leading the Gators' tennis program, Stanley compiled a team win–loss record of 54–12 (.818), still the best coaching record in the history of the program as measured by winning percentage. Stanley, who also served as the head coach of Florida's football and track teams, left the university in 1940, but later returned as the first dean of its College of Health and Human Performance.

Florida's men's tennis program became the second at the school to win a Southeastern Conference championship (after men's swimming) upon winning the SEC tournament title in 1950. Overall, the program has earned twelve SEC team tournament championships (1950, 1961, 1968, 1969, 1975, 1994, 2000, 2003, 2005, 2019, 2021, 2022) along with twelve regular season conference crowns. Since there was no tournament held in 2020 due to the Covid-19 pandemic, the Gators enter the 2022-2023 season as the three-time defending SEC champions after compiling a 40-1 regular season conference record over that timeframe.

Florida's men tennis program has been one of the nation's top college programs for several decades and have been invited to the NCAA men's tennis championship tournament every year save one (1996) since 1991 and are consistently ranked in the top-10. The Gators advanced to the NCAA tournament quarterfinals on numerous occasions and have an all-time record of 64-29 in NCAA tournament dual matches. They won their first team national championship in 2021.

In individual match play, Gators Mark Merklein and David Blair claimed the NCAA doubles championships in 1993. Merklein won the NCAA singles championship in 1994, losing just one set while defeating six tournament opponents. Gator Jeff Morrison claimed the NCAA singles championship in 1999, also losing only a single set on the way to the title. Sam Riffice won the NCAA singles championship in 2021, defeating the number one and two seeds in consecutive days.  The following year, Ben Shelton kept the NCAA singles championship in the program by winning the title in 2022.

Year-by-year results 

The Florida Gators overall record is 1,326–528–6 through the 2019–2020 season.

All-Americans 
As of the end of the 2021-2022 season, thirty-one members of the Florida Gators men's tennis teams have earned sixty-one All-American honors.

 Ben Shelton - Singles (2021, 2022), 2022 NCAA Champion (singles)
 Sam Raffice - Doubles (2020), Singles (2019, 2020, 2021), 2021 NCAA Champion (singles)
 Oliver Crawford - Doubles (2020), Singles (2019, 2020)
 Duarte Vale - Doubles (2018), Singles (2020, 2021)
 McClain Kessler - Doubles (2018)
 Johannes Ingildsen - Doubles (2017, 2018) 
 Alfredo Perez - Singles (2017, 2018), Doubles (2017, 2018)
 Diego Hidalgo – Singles (2016), Doubles (2016)
 Gordon Watson – Doubles (2016)
 Florent Diep – Singles (2014)
 Bob Van Overbeek – Doubles (2013)
 Stephane Piro – Doubles (2013)
 Sekou Bangoura – Doubles (2011)
 Alexndre Lacroix – Singles (2010, 2011), Doubles (2010, 2011)
 Antoine Benneteau – Doubles (2010)
 Gregory Ouellette – Singles (2005, 2007, 2008), Doubles (2005, 2007)
 Jesse Levine – Singles (2007), Doubles (2007)
 Hamid Mirzadeh – Singles (2003, 2004, 2005), Doubles (2004, 2005)
 Chris Brandi – Doubles (2004)
 Janne Holmia – Singles (2003)
 Justin O'Neal – Singles (1997, 1999, 2000)
 Jeff Morrison – Singles (1999, 2000), Doubles (1999, 2000)
 Nathan Overholser – Singles (1999, 2000), Doubles (2000)
 Damon Henkel – Singles (1994, 1995, 1996)
 Dyllan Fitzgerald – Doubles (1994)
 Mark Merklein – Singles (1993, 1994), Doubles (1993, 1994)
 David Blair – Doubles (1993)
 Armistead Neely – Singles (1969), Doubles (1968)
 Jamie Pressly – Singles (1969)
 Bill Tym – Singles (1963)
 Jim Shaffer – Singles (1961)

See also 

 Florida Gators
 Florida Gators women's tennis
 History of the University of Florida
 List of Florida Gators tennis players
 List of University of Florida Athletic Hall of Fame members
 University Athletic Association

References

External links 
 

 
Sports clubs established in 1932
1932 establishments in Florida